Roura is a commune of French Guiana, an overseas region and department of France located in South America. The city of Roura is bordered by Matoury and Montsinéry-Tonnegrande in the North, Kourou and Saint-Elie in the North West and West, and finally by Régina in the South and East.

History
The town of Roura was founded in 1675 by Jesuits. In 1786, Marquis de Lafayette attempted an early emancipation of the slaves by allowing small scale agriculture on the savanna Gabriel near Roury. The experiment failed, and was abandoned in 1796. Between 1809 and 1817, Roura was captured by the Portuguese and part of Brazil. In 1848, slavery was abolished.

Cacao is a village of Hmong farmers. The population were refugees from Laos who were resettled in French Guiana in 1977 The reasoning was that living, and working conditions were similar to their native land.

Population

Roads

The city of Roura is home to 2 main roads. 
 The RD6 road leads to the landing stage of Kaw. This  road follows a thalweg through the primal forest.
 The RN2 road leads to towns of Régina and Saint-Georges.

Nature
In 1998, the Kaw-Roura Marshland Nature Reserve was established, and covers an area of 94,700 hectares between Roura and Régina, and is sometimes nicknamed "the Everglades of Guyana".

The Trésor Regional Nature Reserve is a 2,464 hectares nature reserve situated on the flank of the Kaw Mountain. It became a protected area in 2010.

Villages
Bélizon
Cacao

See also
Communes of French Guiana

References

External links
 Official website of the commune (in French)

Communes of French Guiana